Atomic Clock is a studio album by Zion I. It was released by Gold Dust Media in 2010. It peaked at number 24 on the Billboard Heatseekers Albums chart, as well as number 64 on the Top R&B/Hip-Hop Albums chart.

Critical reception

Eric Luecking of AllMusic gave the album 3 out of 5 stars, writing, "Anyone who enjoys crisp beats will be able to find at least a few songs to nod their heads to." Meanwhile, David Maine of PopMatters gave the album 5 out of 10 stars, describing it as "a record that starts strong, then fades."

Track listing

Charts

References

External links
 

2010 albums
Zion I albums